The 1947 Villanova Wildcats football team was an American football team that represented Villanova University as an independent during the 1947 college football season. In its fifth season under head coach Jordan Olivar, the team compiled a 6–3–1 record and lost to Kentucky in the 1947 Great Lakes Bowl.

The team played three of its home games at Shibe Park in Philadelphia and one game at Villanova Stadium in Villanova, Pennsylvania.

Schedule

References

Villanova
Villanova Wildcats football seasons
Villanova Wildcats football